Jimmy Kilrain Kelly (born 1 September 1992) is a British professional boxer. He held the WBO Inter-Continental light-middleweight title and challenged for the WBO light-middleweight title in 2015.

Amateur career

As an amateur, Kelly won three junior ABA titles and two national schoolboy titles. Before turning professional at 19, Kelly's amateur record stood at 70-5.

Professional career

Light middleweight

Kelly vs. Rios 

Kelly outpointed Martin Fidel Rios over ten rounds at the AO Arena, Manchester capturing the WBO Inter-Continental light middleweight title with a unanimous decision win with the scorecards 99-89, 100-87 and 98-89.

Kelly vs. Smith 

In 2015, Kelly faced Liam Smith for the WBO light middleweight title. Kelly lost in the seventh round by TKO.

Kelly vs. Kostov 

Kelly became the WBO Inter-Continental light middleweight titleholder again, knocking down Kostov in the first round and twice in the fourth where the fight was halted by TKO.

Middleweight

Kelly vs. Islam 

In ProBox Promotions’ main event in Plant City, Florida, Kelly defeated middleweight contender Kanat Islam handing him his first loss despite being the underdog.  Kelly captured the WBO global middleweight title with scores 95-95, 96-94 and 97-93, a majority decision.

Catchweight

Kelly vs. Munguía 

Kelly faced former WBO junior middleweight champion Jaime Munguía at the Honda Center in Anaheim, California in a catchweight bout with Kelly weighing in at 164 pounds and Munguía 165. Kelly suffered three knockdowns before the referee stopped the bout in round five.

Personal life 
Kelly was born on 1 September 1992 in Manchester and grew up in the Wythenshawe area of the city. His middle name, Kilrain, was taken from the 1800s bare-knuckle boxer Jack Kilrain. Kelly's father, a former amateur boxer, was born in Ireland. Before every fight, Kelly takes a blade of grass from his mother's graveside and places it in his hand wraps.

Professional boxing record

References 

1992 births
Living people
Irish male boxers
Middleweight boxers